Josephine Leemans-Verbustel (born 13 August 1927 in Mechelen, Belgium), better known as Jo Leemans, is a Belgian singer who was given the nickname "The Flemish Doris Day" in the 1950s.

She had multiple number 1 hits in the national hit parade including "Que Sera Sera", a Dutch cover of the song by Doris Day, only one month after the original.

Asides from being a singer, she also had a career as a TV and radio host.

Sources
 Jo Leemans at the Belgian pop and rock archive
 Dutch Wikipedia page on Jo Leemans

1927 births
Living people
Belgian women singers
Musicians from Mechelen